The 2022–23 Hobart Hurricanes Women's season was the eighth in the team's history. Coached by Dan Marsh and captained by Elyse Villani, the Hurricanes finished the regular season of WBBL08 in fourth place and qualified for the finals for the first time since WBBL02. They were eliminated from the knockout phase of the tournament, losing to the Brisbane Heat in the Eliminator.

Squad 
Each 2022–23 squad was made up of 15 active players. Teams could sign up to five 'marquee players', with a maximum of three of those from overseas. Marquees were defined as any overseas player, or a local player who holds a Cricket Australia national contract at the start of the WBBL|08 signing period.

Personnel changes made ahead of the season included:

 Australian marquee Tayla Vlaeminck departed the Hurricanes, returning to the Melbourne Renegades.
 Belinda Vakarewa departed the Hurricanes, returning to the Sydney Thunder.
 New Zealand marquee Rachel Priest did not re-sign with the Hurricanes.
 Indian marquee Richa Ghosh did not re-sign with the Hurricanes.
 South African marquee Lizelle Lee signed with the Hurricanes, having previously played for the Melbourne Stars and Melbourne Renegades.
 English marquee Issy Wong signed with the Hurricanes, having previously played for the Sydney Thunder. Wong would be made unavailable to participate in the season due to injury.
 New Zealand marquee Hayley Jensen returned to the Hurricanes, signing as a replacement player.
 Sasha Moloney departed the Hurricanes, signing with the Melbourne Stars.
 Angelina Genford departed the Hurricanes, signing with the Sydney Sixers.
 Heather Graham signed with the Hurricanes, having previously played for the Perth Scorchers.
 Elyse Villani signed with the Hurricanes, having previously played for the Perth Scorchers and Melbourne Stars. Villani was also appointed captain of the team, replacing Rachel Priest.
 Hayley Silver-Holmes signed with the Hurricanes, having previously played for the Sydney Sixers.
 Dan Marsh was appointed head coach, replacing Salliann Beams.

The table below lists the Hurricanes players and their key stats (including runs scored, batting strike rate, wickets taken, economy rate, catches and stumpings) for the season.

Ladder

Fixtures 
All times are AEDT.

Regular season

Eliminator

Statistics and awards 
 Most runs: Mignon du Preez – 380 (4th in the league)
 Highest score in an innings: Mignon du Preez – 75 (47) vs Adelaide Strikers, 18 November 2022
 Most wickets: Molly Strano – 18 (equal 10th in the league)
 Best bowling figures in an innings: Molly Strano – 4/16 (4 overs) vs Melbourne Renegades, 7 November 2022
 Most catches (fielder): Rachel Trenaman – 7 (equal 12th in the league)
 Player of the Match awards:
 Mignon du Preez, Heather Graham – 2 each
 Maisy Gibson, Lizelle Lee, Molly Strano – 1 each
 WBBL|08 Player of the Tournament: Mignon du Preez, Heather Graham (equal 6th)
 WBBL|08 Team of the Tournament: Molly Strano

References

Further reading

 

2022–23 Women's Big Bash League season by team
Hobart Hurricanes (WBBL)